Cheung Hon-chung (born 25 May 1958, Hong Kong) was the member of the Legislative Council in 1995–97 for New Territories North, which was the only two of the 20 geographical constituency seats the pro-Beijing Democratic Alliance for the Betterment of Hong Kong in the 1995 Legislative Council Election. In the 1998 Election, he was placed second on list behind Lau Kong-wah in New Territories East and was not able to be reelected to the LegCo. He joined the Provisional Legislative Council existed from 1996 to 98. He was also the North District Board member from 1982 to 85 and Regional Council member.

References

1958 births
Living people
Members of the Selection Committee of Hong Kong
Members of the Provisional Legislative Council
Members of the Regional Council of Hong Kong
District councillors of North District
Liberal Democratic Federation of Hong Kong politicians
Democratic Alliance for the Betterment and Progress of Hong Kong politicians
HK LegCo Members 1995–1997
20th-century Chinese politicians
21st-century Chinese politicians
20th-century Hong Kong people
21st-century Hong Kong people